50 Cent is an American rapper. After releasing his mixtape Guess Who's Back? in 2002, he was discovered by rapper Eminem and signed to Interscope Records. His commercial debut album Get Rich or Die Tryin' (2003) earned him a Best New Artist nomination at the 46th Grammy Awards, a Billboard Music Award for Album of the Year, and the ASCAP Songwriter of the Year Award. 50 Cent's second album The Massacre (2005) earned him five Grammy nominations, six Billboard Music Awards, and another ASCAP Songwriter of the Year award. His third album Curtis made him the Best-Selling Hip-Hop Artist at the 2007 World Music Awards. Currently, 50 Cent has received 86 awards from 135 nominations.

American Music Awards
50 Cent has won three awards from six nominations at the annual  American Music Awards.

|-
|rowspan="3"|2003
|Get Rich or Die Tryin'
|Favorite Rap/Hip-Hop Album
|
|-
|rowspan="2"|50 Cent
|Favorite Rap/Hip-Hop Male Artist
|
|-
|Fan's Choice Award
|
|-
|rowspan="3"|2005
|The Massacre
|Favorite Rap/Hip-Hop Album
|
|-
|rowspan="2"|50 Cent
|Favorite Pop/Rock Male Artist
|
|-
|Favorite Rap/Hip-Hop Male Artist
|
|}

ASCAP Awards
The ASCAP Awards are held annually by the American Society of Composers, Authors and Publishers.

Pop Music Awards
The annual ASCAP Pop Music Awards honors the songwriters and publishers of the most performed pop songs. 50 Cent has won four awards.

|-
|2004
|50 Cent
|Songwriter of the Year1
|
|-
|rowspan="2"|2005
|"In da Club"
|Most Performed Song
|
|-
|"P.I.M.P."
|Most Performed Song
|
|-
||2006
|50 Cent
|Songwriter of the Year2
|
|}

1 Awarded for "21 Questions", "In da Club", and "Magic Stick".
2 Awarded for "Candy Shop", "Disco Inferno", "Hate It or Love It", "How We Do", and "Just a Lil Bit".

Rhythm & Soul Music Awards
The annual ASCAP Rhythm & Soul Music Awards honors songwriters and publishers of top R&B, hip hop, and reggae music. 50 Cent has won seven awards.

|-
|rowspan="3"|2004
|50 Cent
|Songwriter of the Year3
|
|-
|"In da Club"
|Top R&B/Hip-Hop Song
|
|-
|"In da Club"
|Top Rap Song
|
|-
|2005
|"In da Club"
|Top Ringtone Song of the Year
|
|-
|rowspan="3"|2006
|50 Cent
|Songwriter of the Year4
|
|-
|"How We Do"
|Top Rap Song
|
|-
|"Candy Shop"
|Ringtone of the Year
|
|}

3 Awarded for "21 Questions", "In da Club", "Magic Stick", "P.I.M.P.", and "Wanksta".
4 Awarded for "Candy Shop", "Disco Inferno", "Hate It or Love It", "How We Do", and "Just a Lil Bit".

AVN Awards
The AVN Awards are movie awards sponsored and presented by the American adult video industry trade magazine AVN (Adult Video News). 50 Cent has won two awards from four nominations.

|-
|rowspan="4"|2005
|rowspan="4"|Groupie Love
|Best Interactive DVD
|
|-
|Best Music
|
|-
|Best DVD Extras
|
|-
|Best DVD Menus
|
|}

BET Awards
The BET Awards were established in 2001 by the Black Entertainment Television network to celebrate African Americans and other minorities in music, acting, sports, and other fields of entertainment. The awards are presented annually and broadcast live on BET. 50 Cent has won four awards from eight nominations.

|-
|rowspan="2"|2003
|rowspan="2"|50 Cent
|Best New Artist
|
|-
|Best Male Hip-Hop Artist
|
|-
|rowspan="3"|2004
|50 Cent
|Best Male Hip-Hop Artist
|
|-
|G-Unit
|Best Group
|
|-
|"Hate It or Love It"
|Best Collaboration
|
|-
|2005
|50 Cent
|Best Male Hip-Hop Artist
|
|-
|rowspan="2"|2006
|rowspan="2"|50 Cent
|Best Hip-Hop Artist
|
|-
|Best Male Hip-Hop Artist
|
|}

BET Hip Hop Awards
The BET Hip Hop Awards are hosted annually by BET for hip hop performers, producers, and music video directors. 50 Cent has been won first, but from his second nominations.

|-
|rowspan="3"|2007
|50 Cent
|Hustler of the Year
|
|-
|rowspan="2"|"I Get Money"
|Track of the Year
|
|-
|Best Hip Hop Video
|
|-
|2008
|50 Cent
|Hustler of the Year
|
|-
|2009
|Thisis50
|Best Hip Hop Online Site
|
|-
|2010
|Thisis50
|Best Hip Hop Online Site
|
|}

Billboard Music Awards
The Billboard Music Awards are sponsored by Billboard magazine and is held annually in December. The awards are based on sales data by Nielsen SoundScan and radio information by Nielsen Broadcast Data Systems. 50 Cent has won thirteen awards from eighteen nominations.

|-
|rowspan="6"|2003
|Get Rich or Die Tryin'
|Album of the Year
|
|-
|"In Da Club"
|Hot 100 Single of the Year
|
|-
|rowspan="4"|50 Cent
|Artist of the Year
|
|-
|R&B/Hip-Hop Artist of the Year
|
|-
|Rap Artist of the Year
|
|-
|Hot 100 Male Artist of the Year
|
|-
|rowspan="2"|2004
|"In da Club"
|Ringtone of the Year
|
|-
|"P.I.M.P."
|Ringtone of the Year
|
|-
|rowspan="10"|2005
|rowspan="4"|50 Cent
|Artist of the Year
|
|-
|Hot 100 Artist of the Year
|
|-
|R&B/Hip-Hop Artist of the Year
|
|-
|Rap Artist of the Year
|
|-
|rowspan="2"|"Candy Shop"
|Ringtone of the Year
|
|-
|Rap Song of the Year
|
|-
|"How We Do"
|Rap Song of the Year
|
|-
|rowspan="3"|The Massacre
|Album of the Year
|
|-
|R&B/Hip-Hop Album of the Year
|
|-
|Rap Album of the Year
|
|}

Billboard R&B/Hip-Hop Awards
The Billboard R&B/Hip-Hop Awards reflect the performance of recordings on the R&B/hip-hop and rap charts. 50 Cent has won all sixteen awards from the sixteen nominations.

|-
|rowspan="10"|2003
|rowspan="5"|50 Cent
|Top R&B/Hip-Hop Artist
|
|-
|Top Male R&B/Hip-Hop Artist
|
|-
|Top New R&B/Hip-Hop Artist
|
|-
|Top R&B/Hip-Hop Singles Artist
|
|-
|Top R&B/Hip-Hop Album Artist
|
|-
|rowspan="2"|Get Rich or Die Tryin'''
|Top R&B/Hip-Hop Album
|
|-
|Top Rap Album
|
|-
|rowspan="3"|"In da Club"
|Top R&B/Hip-Hop Single
|
|-
|Top R&B/Hip-Hop Singles Airplay
|
|-
|Hot Rap Track of the Year
|
|-
|rowspan="6"|2005
|rowspan="4"|50 Cent
|Top R&B/Hip-Hop Album Artist
|
|-
|Top R&B/Hip-Hop Artist
|
|-
|Top Male R&B/Hip-Hop Artist
|
|-
|Top R&B/Hip-Hop Singles Artist
|
|-
|rowspan="2"|The Massacre''
|Top R&B/Hip-Hop Album
|
|-
|Top Rap Album
|
|}

BRIT Awards
The BRIT Awards are an annual awards ceremony presented by the British Phonographic Industry, related to popular music. 50 Cent has been nominated for a total of three Brit Awards and has won one of them.

|-
|rowspan="3"|2004
|rowspan="3"|50 Cent
|Best International Breakthrough Artist
|
|-
|Best International Male
|
|-
|Best International Album
|
|}

Danish Music Awards

|-
|rowspan="2"|2004
|"In da Club"
|International Hit Of the Year
|
|-
|50 Cent
|Foreign Newcomer Of the Year
|
|}

GAFFA Awards

Denmark GAFFA Awards
Delivered since 1991, the GAFFA Awards are a Danish award that rewards popular music by the magazine of the same name.

!
|-
| 2003
| Himself
| Best Foreign New Act
| 
| style="text-align:center;" |
|-
|}

Grammy Awards
The Grammy Awards are awarded annually by the National Academy of Recording Arts and Sciences. 50 Cent has been nominated 14 times and won 1.

World Music Awards
The annual World Music Awards, founded in 1989, is an international awards show that honors recording artists based on their worldwide sales figures, which are provided by the International Federation of the Phonographic Industry. 50 Cent has won six awards.

|-
|rowspan="5"|2003
|rowspan="8"|50 Cent
|Best Artist of the Year
|
|-
|Best New Artist
|
|-
|Best R&B Act
|
|-
|Best Hip-Hop Act
|
|-
|Best Pop Act
|
|-
|2007
|Best-Selling Hip-Hop Artist
|
|-
|rowspan="4"|2012
|Best Male Artist
|
|-
|Best Artist Entertainer of The Year
|
|-
|rowspan="2"|"My Life" (with Eminem and Adam Levine)
|Best Song
|
|-
|Best Video
|
|}

References

Awards
50 Cent